The Alameda County Fire Department (ACFD) provides all-risk emergency services to the unincorporated areas of Alameda County, California (excluding Fairview), the cities of San Leandro, Dublin, Newark, Union City and Emeryville, the Lawrence Berkeley National Laboratory and the Lawrence Livermore National Laboratory. With 28 fire stations and 35 companies serving a population of 394,000, the ACFD serves densely populated urban areas, waterways, industrialized centers, extensive urban interface, agricultural and wildland regions.

These services include:

 Advanced Life Support Emergency Medical Services Response
 Fire Suppression Response
 Hazardous Materials Response
 Urban Search & Rescue Response
 Water Rescue Response
 Community Outreach & Education efforts
 Disaster Preparedness
 Fire Prevention and Code Compliance efforts
 Regional Dispatch

History
The Alameda County Fire Department (ACFD) was formed on July 1, 1993 as a dependent special district with the Alameda County Board of Supervisors as its governing body. This consolidation brought together into a single jurisdiction the Castro Valley Fire Department, Eden Consolidated Fire Protection District and County Fire Patrol. Subsequently, the following communities have contracted with the ACFD:

 July 1, 1995 City of San Leandro, California
 July 1, 1997 City of Dublin, California
 August 1, 2002 Lawrence Berkeley National Laboratory
 October 1, 2007 Lawrence Livermore National Laboratory
 May 1, 2010 City of Newark, California
 July 1, 2010 City of Union City, California
 July 1, 2012 City of Emeryville, California

On January 20, 2008, the ACFD became responsible for the administration and operation of the Alameda County Regional Emergency Communications Center (ACRECC). The dispatch center provides dispatch and regional communication center services for the ACFD, the Alameda County Emergency Medical Services Agency, Camp Parks Combat Support Training Center, and the cities of Alameda, Fremont, Livermore and Pleasanton.

USAR Task Force 4 
The Alameda County Fire Department has multiple members that participate in California USAR Task Force 4 (CA-TF4.) CA-TF4 is one of eight FEMA Urban Search and Rescue Task Forces in the State of California and 28 nationally. CA-TF4 is based in Oakland and is sponsored by the Oakland Fire Department.

Stations & Equipment 
The Alameda County Fire Department utilizes a wide variety of firefighting and specialized apparatus, including Engines, Trucks, Quints, Wildland Engines (Type 3 or Type 6,) Dozers and Water Tenders. Special Operations Vehicles include Rescue Boats, HazMat Units and a Rescue Unit. The Department has four Battalions. Stations 6,7,22,23,24,25 and 26 are in Battalion 2. Battalion 6 has Stations 8,16,17,18,20 and 21. Stations 9,10,11,12,13,19,35 and 34 are in Battalion 4. Stations 27,28,29,30,31,32 and 33 are in Battalion 7.

See also

Alameda County

References

County government agencies in California
Government of Alameda County, California
Fire departments in California
Government agencies established in 1993
1993 establishments in California